Roman Ruler (March 20, 2002 – January 25, 2017) was an American Thoroughbred racehorse, winner of the 2005  Haskell Invitational.

Career

Roman Ruler's first race was on June 19, 2004, at Hollywood Park Racetrack, where he won on his debut. He followed it up with a win at the 2004 Best Pal Stakes on August 15, 2004. He then captured his third win of the year on October 3, 2004, in the Norfolk Stakes.

Ruler's next win came on July 4, 2005, in the Dwyer Stakes and on August 7, 2005, he won the 2005 Haskell Invitational.

He finished his career off with a second-place finish in the Goodwood Breeders' Cup Handicap, before retiring. Due to his successful year in 2005, he ranked 22nd place in the Top 100 Rankings.

Death
Roman Ruler died on January 25, 2017.

Stud career
Roman Ruler's descendants include:

c = colt, f = filly

Pedigree

References

2002 racehorse births
Racehorses bred in Kentucky
Racehorses trained in the United States
Thoroughbred family 8-h